"Worms of the Earth" is a short story by American fantasy fiction writer Robert E. Howard. It was originally published in the magazine Weird Tales in November 1932, then again in 1975 in a collection of Howard's short stories, Worms of the Earth. The story features one of Howard's recurring protagonists, Bran Mak Morn, a legendary king of the Picts.

Plot
Bran Mak Morn, King of the Picts, vows vengeance on Titus Sulla, a Roman governor, after witnessing the crucifixion of a fellow Pict. He seeks forbidden aid from the Worms of the Earth, a race of creatures who Bran Mak Morn's ancestors banished from their kingdom centuries ago. They were once men, but millennia of living underground caused them to become monstrous and semi-reptilian. 

Searching for a contact with these creatures, Bran Mak Morn encounters a witch who lives in a secluded hut, shunned by her neighbors, who was born from a sexual encounter between one of the "Worms" and a human woman. The witch's price for helping him is "one night of love" which her human-half craves - as men in general are repelled by her reptilian traits. Bran Mak Morn, though also himself repelled, agrees to pay the price. In exchange, she tells him of a barrow where "The Black Stone", a religious artifact of great importance to the "Worms", is hidden.

Stealing the Black Stone is a highly risky enterprise - if caught by the "Worms", Bran Mak Morn would die in torment "as no man had died for a thousand years". Fortunately, the barrow is unguarded and he manages to carry out his theft by hiding the Stone at the bottom of a lake. To get it back, the "Worms" agree on delivering Sulla to him. This they proceed with, undermining and destroying a Roman fortress known as "Trajan's Tower" before snatching the Roman governor into their tunnels. Mak Morn intended, once Sulla was delivered, on challenging him to a duel to the death. However, Sulla's mind is damaged from his encounter with the horrific Worms of the Earth. Instead, Bran Mak Morn slays him in mercy rather than vengeance, realizing that some weapons are too foul to use, even against Rome.

Reception
In a 1932 letter to August Derleth, Clark Ashton Smith, discussing the current issue of Weird Tales, stated that "Howard’s “Worms of the Earth” seems to be the one real first-rater." In an obituary for Howard, H. P. Lovecraft said " Few readers will ever forget the hideous and compelling power of that macabre masterpiece, "Worms of the Earth"". Robert Weinberg called "Worms of the Earth" "an effective blend of horror and adventure", and said it was one of Howard's "best works".

Adaptation
A two-part and thirty-seven page comic strip adaptation in black and white, adapted by Roy Thomas and penciled by Tim Conrad and Barry Windsor-Smith, was published by Marvel Comics' Curtis Magazines brand in December 1976 and February 1977, in issues #16 and #17 of The Savage Sword of Conan. A trade paperback version in full color was published by Cross Plains Comics/Wandering Star in October 2000.

Notes
Twice in Worms of the Earth Howard mentions the "black gods" of R'lyeh, a fictional city created by his friend and correspondent H. P. Lovecraft. Also mentioned is a water monster "Dagon", which is a historical Philistine god mentioned in a fictional context in several stories by Lovecraft. Howard had previously dealt with beings similar to the titular Worms of the Earth in an earlier short story, "The Children of the Night", set in Lovecraft's Cthulhu Mythos.

References
Howard, Robert E. Worms of the Earth, Ace Books. 1987 edition, 
Howard, Robert E.  "Worms of the Earth", Bran Mak Morn: The Last King, Del Rey Books, June 2005

External links 
 
 
 Works of Robert E. Howard - Publication history for Worms of the Earth
Internet Archive, 
Robert E. Howard bibliography, Fantasticfiction.co.uk

1932 short stories
Fantasy short stories
Pulp stories
Short stories by Robert E. Howard
Picts in fiction
Works originally published in Weird Tales